"Candidatus Midichloriaceae" is a family of bacteria, included in the order Rickettsiales. No member of this family has been cultured in the laboratory, so the entire family has been given the status candidatus.

References

Rickettsiales